Jiugong Station is a subway station on the Yizhuang Line of the Beijing Subway.

Station Layout 
The station has 2 elevated side platforms.

Exits 
There are 2 exits, lettered A1 and B1. Exit A1 is accessible.

References

External links

Beijing Subway stations in Daxing District
Railway stations in China opened in 2010